Yedoma is a rural locality (a selo) in Zheleznodorozhnoye Rural Settlement, Sheksninsky District, Vologda Oblast, Russia. The population was 21 as of 2002.

Geography 
Yedoma is located 18 km southwest of Sheksna (the district's administrative centre) by road. Maurino is the nearest rural locality.

References 

Rural localities in Sheksninsky District